Mangalagudem is a small village located in Khammam district of the Indian state of Telangana.

Villages in Khammam district